William Fox may refer to:

Entertainment

 William Fox (producer) (1879–1952), founder of movie studio Fox Film Corporation
 William Fox (actor) (1911–2008), English comedy actor
 William Fox (born 1939), birth and early professional name of James Fox
 William Price Fox (1926–2015), American novelist and essayist

Politics
 William Foxe (1480–1554), MP for Ludlow
 William Fox (MP for City of York), 14th century Member of Parliament (MP) for City of York
 William Fox (pamphleteer) (fl. 1791–1794), abolitionist
 William Johnson Fox (1786–1864), British politician
 William Fox (politician) (1812–1893), Premier of New Zealand
 William H. Fox (1837–1913), Massachusetts lawyer, jurist, and politician

Sports
 William Fox (footballer), Irish international footballer active in the 1880s
 William Victor Fox (1898–1949), English footballer and cricketer
 William Fox (wrestler) (1912–1999), English freestyle sport wrestler

Other
 William Fox (fl. 17th century), Paymaster of the Forces of England
 William Fox (pirate) (fl. 1717–1723), English pirate in the Caribbean
 William Fox (deacon) (1736–1826), founder of the Sunday School Society
 William Darwin Fox (1805–1880), English clergyman and amateur scientist
 William Fox (palaeontologist) (1813–1881), English clergyman and palaeontologist
 William Tilbury Fox (1836–1879), English dermatologist
 William R. Fox (1837–1888), American soldier and Medal of Honor recipient
 William F. Fox (1840–1909), American forester, author, member of 28th Regiment United States Colored Troops
 William T. R. Fox (1912–1988), American professor of foreign policy at Columbia University
 William Sherwood Fox (1878–1967), Canadian classical scholar

See also
 Bill Fox (disambiguation)
 Billy Fox (disambiguation)
 Henry Fox Talbot (William Henry Fox Talbot, 1800–1877), pioneer of photography
 William Fox-Pitt (born 1969), British eventing rider
 William Fox-Strangways, 4th Earl of Ilchester (1795–1865), British diplomat, nobleman and Whig politician